Maksim Viktorovich Berdnik (born 18 January 1986) is a former Russian professional footballer.

External links
 
 

1986 births
Living people
People from Pyatigorsk
Russian footballers
Association football midfielders
FBK Kaunas footballers
FK Šilutė players
FC Dnepr Mogilev players
FC Dynamo Stavropol players
FC Vitebsk players
FC Granit Mikashevichi players
FC Volgar Astrakhan players
FC Tekstilshchik Ivanovo players
A Lyga players
Belarusian Premier League players
Russian expatriate footballers
Expatriate footballers in Lithuania
Expatriate footballers in Belarus
Sportspeople from Stavropol Krai
FC Chayka Peschanokopskoye players
FC Mashuk-KMV Pyatigorsk players